Mozart and Salieri is a poetic drama by Alexander Pushkin. The play was written in 1830 as one of his four short plays known as The Little Tragedies, and was published in 1832. Based on one of the numerous rumours caused by the early death of Mozart, it features only three characters: Mozart, Antonio Salieri, and a non-speaking part in the blind fiddler whose playing Mozart finds hilarious, and Salieri is appalled by. It was the only one of Pushkin's plays that was staged during his lifetime. 

Mozart and Salieri was the inspiration for Peter Shaffer's 1979 play Amadeus, which Shaffer adapted for the 1984 film of the same name.

Adaptations 
 1897 – Mozart and Salieri, opera by Nikolai Rimsky-Korsakov.
 1914 – Mozart and Salieri, silent film by Victor Tourjansky.
 1979 – Little Tragedies, a 1979 Soviet television miniseries.

External links 
 Mozart and Salieri, English translation.
 A production of the play as an audiodrama .

References

1830 plays
Biographical plays about musicians
Plays by Aleksandr Pushkin
Plays adapted into operas
Russian plays adapted into films
Wolfgang Amadeus Mozart in fiction
Cultural depictions of Wolfgang Amadeus Mozart
Cultural depictions of Antonio Salieri